Zingnu Namchoom (b 1977) is a Member of Legislative Assembly (MLA) of Arunachal Pradesh of Bhartiya Janta Party from 47 Namsai constituency in the Namsai, (earlier Lohit district) of Arunachal Pradesh.

He belonged to the Indian National Congress until 2016 when he joined the People's Party of Arunachal and has been a member of the Arunachal Pradesh Legislative Assembly since 2014.

Zingnu Namchoom was one of 6 MLAs along with Chief Minister Pema Khandu to be suspended by the PPA for anti-party activities.

References

Living people
1977 births
People from Namsai district
Arunachal Pradesh MLAs 2014–2019
Indian National Congress politicians
Arunachal Pradesh MLAs 2019–2024